Alberto Morillas (born 1950) is a Spanish perfumer. He is a master perfumer at Swiss fragrance and flavor firm Firmenich, where his notable creations have included Calvin Klein CK One, Giorgio Armani Acqua di Giò and Marc Jacobs Daisy. He has an independent line called Mizensir.

Early life 
Morillas was born in 1950 in Seville, Spain and moved to Switzerland at age ten. He studied for two years at the Ecole des Beaux Arts in Geneva.

He cites as early scent memories his mother's bottle of Rochas Femme and his father's hair tonic.

Career

Firmenich 
Mainly self-taught, Morillas began working in perfumery at 20, inspired by a Vogue article about French perfumer Jean-Paul Guerlain. He joined Swiss fragrance and flavor firm Firmenich in 1970 and has gone on to create nearly 7000 perfumes. He established himself with the 1975 creation Must de Cartier, the jewelry company's first fragrance.

Among Morillas's notable creations is CK One, developed with Harry Fremont in 1994 for Calvin Klein fashion brand. In the mid-1990s, CK One had annual sales of about $90 million (USD) and in 2007 still sold about $30 million annually in the United States. In Perfumes: The Guide, Luca Turin gave CK One four of five stars, describing it as a "radiant citrus" that combines "soapy, fresh top notes" with heart and base notes simultaneously, creating a linear effect in which the scent sustains one "chord" rather than shapeshifting over the course of the day: "Time forever stands still at 8 a.m.: the frozen morning of a day full of promise." It is often cited as the first "unisex" fragrance (though historians note that dividing fragrances by gender was itself a relative novelty, a development of 20th-century marketing techniques.)

Other projects 
In 1997, Morillas and his wife began a line of scented candles called Mizensir, which grew to offer 80 different candles. In 2015, Morillas expanded the brand to include 17 perfumes. In collaboration with Penhaligon's, Morillas also has a custom perfumery service, Bespoke by Alberto Morillas, based the Salon de Parfum in department store Harrods in London.

Awards 
Morillas won the Prix François Coty in 2003.

Personal life
Morillas lives in Geneva, after periods in Paris and New York.

Perfumes

 Calvin Klein CK One (1994)
 Estée Lauder Pleasures (1995)
 Givenchy Pi (1998)
 Giorgio Armani Acqua di Gio (1996)
 Giorgio Armani Acqua di Gio Pour Homme
 Kenzo Flower (2000)
 Tommy Hilfiger Tommy
 Marc Jacobs Daisy
 Valentino Valentina (2011)
 Versace Pour Homme
 Gucci Bloom
Gucci Bloom Acqua di Fiori (2018)
Gucci Bloom Nettare di Fiori
  Gucci Guilty Absolute
Gucci Guilty Absolute Pour Femme
Titan Skinn
Eric Buterbaugh Apollo Hyacinth (2015)
Eric Buterbaugh Fragile Violet (2015)
Eric Buterbaugh Kingston Osmanthus (2016)
Bulgari Omnia (2003)
Bulgari Goldea (2017)
Bulgari Man Wood Essence (2018)
Bulgari Omnia Pink Sapphire (2018)
By Kilian Good Girl Gone Bad (2012)
By Kilian Good Girl Gone Bad Extreme (2017)
By Kilian Musk Oud
 Le Labo Vanille 44
 Mizensir Bois De Mysore
 Mizensir L'Envers Du Paradis
 Mizensir Little Bianca
 Mizensir Sweet Praline
 Mizensir Vanilla Bergamot
 Mizensir Eau De Gingembre
 Must de Cartier (1975)
 Penhaligon's Iris Prima (2013)
 Thierry Mugler Cologne
 Zara Home Aqua Bergamota (2016)
 Zara Home Evitorial Twist (2016)
 Fragrance One Office For Men (2018)
 O Boticário Malbec Bleu (2021)
 Fragrance One Black Tie (2021)

References

Living people
Perfumers
Spanish emigrants to Switzerland
Businesspeople from Geneva
1950 births